Calla is a Swedish feminine given name and surname given name that is a short form of Carolina and an alternate form of Kalla. Calla is also an English feminine given name, but its derived from the Greek root name Kalós. Calla is an Irish feminine given name that is a diminutive form of Caoileann. Notable people who are known by this name include the following:

Given name
Calla Curman (1850–1935), Swedish writer, salon-holder and feminist
Calla Urbanski (born 1960), American pair skater

Surname
Davide Callà (born 1975), Cameroonian football player

Fictional character
Calla from the Calla Lily (TV series)
Princess Calla from Disney's Adventures of the Gummi Bears

See also

Carla
Call (surname)
Callao
Callan (disambiguation)
Calle (name)
Kalla (name)

Notes

English feminine given names
Irish feminine given names
Swedish feminine given names